Gurudaspur is an upazila of Natore District in the Division of Rajshahi, Bangladesh.

Geography
Gurudaspur Upazila area 199.40 km2, located in between 24°18' and 24°27' north latitudes and in between 88°04' and 89°19' east longitudes. The upazila is bounded by Singra and Tarash upazilas on the north, Baraigram upazila on the south, Tarash and Chatmohar upazilas on the east, Natore Sadar Upazila on the west. It has around 32,851 households.

Demographics
Par the 2001 Bangladesh census, Gurudashpur has a population of 194228; male constituted 99086, female 95142; Muslim constituted 186069, Hindu 7873, Buddhist 34 and others 252. Indigenous communities such as Kaibarta, santal, oraon, Pahan, Turi and Banshphod belong to this upazila.

As of the 1991 Bangladesh census, Gurudaspur has a population of 173276. Males constitute 50.72% of the population, and females 49.28%. This Upazila's eighteen up population is 87290. Gurudaspur has an average literacy rate of 23.4% (7+ years), and the national average of 32.4% literate.

Points of interest
Museum at village Khubjipur (1978), Chalan Beel Museum, Mosque at village Palshura Patpara, Mughal Mosque at village Piplar, Kusumhati Mosque (Sultanate period), Chapila Shahi Mosque, Gopinathpur Jami Mosque.

Administration
Gurudaspur, formed as a Thana in 1917, was turned into an upazila in 1984.

Gurudaspur Upazila is divided into Gurudaspur Municipality and six union parishads: Biaghat, Chapila, Dharabarisha, Khubjipur, Moshinda, and Nazirpur. The union parishads are subdivided into 104 mauzas and 110 villages.

Gurudaspur Municipality is subdivided into 9 wards and 18 mahallas.

Source  Bangladesh Population Census 2001, Bangladesh Bureau of Statistics.

See also 
Upazilas of Bangladesh
Districts of Bangladesh
Divisions of Bangladesh

References

External links

References  Bangladesh Population Census 2001, Bangladesh Bureau of Statistics; Cultural survey report of Gurudaspur Upazila 2007.

Upazilas of Natore District